Farrokhabad (also Romanized as Farrokhābād and Farrukhābād) is a village in and coextensive with Farrokhabad Rural District of Meshkin Dasht District, Fardis County, Alborz province, Iran. At the 2006 census, its population was 6,383, in 1,593 households, at which time it was a village in Karaj County, Tehran province. At the latest census in 2016, its population was 5,407 people in 1,675 households.

References 

Fardis County

Populated places in Alborz Province

Populated places in Fardis County